(), a.k.a. (4 July 1767 – 1 December 1848), was a Japanese novelist of the Edo period. Born , he wrote under the pen name . Later in life he took the pen name . He is regarded as one of, if not the, leading author of early 19th century Japanese literature. He was the third surviving son of a  family of low rank. After numerous deaths in his family, he relinquished his  status, married a merchant's widow, and became an  townsperson.

Life and career

Family and early life 
Two of his elder brothers died in infancy.

While serving under ,  was adopted into the family and wed 's adopted daughter, .  returned to serve the  family in 1760 after  successor was dismissed for embezzlement. Though a heavy drinker, he was devoted to scholarship of classical Chinese works, especially those focused on military matters. He was a diligent , but contracted gout in 1773 and died in 1775. His death forced the  clan to reduce the  stipend by half, starting the steady decline of 's family.

, 's mother, is characterized as being a good mother and loyal wife and the family had the privilege of living in the  mansion until their piecemeal departure from 's service that reached its completion in 1780. When  found service with a new family in 1778,  pretended to be ill to move in with him. While living there,  grew ill due to malnutrition and died 1 August 1785.

 served the  lord's grandson until 1780 when he declared himself  at age 14 leaving the following :

こがらしに
思い立ちけり
神の旅

Chilled by winter winds
I have decided
To journey with the gods.

's death humbled  who became ill in 1788. He would study medicine but find the profession uncomfortable before pursuing jobs as a comic poet, fortuneteller, comedian, and Confucian Scholar. 's turning point came in 1790 when he approached the very successful author, seeking help with the publication of the former 's first work, .

In 1798  died of dysentery leaving  as the sole male heir of the  line. He swore to restore the family line. 's two daughters had died of illness in infancy.

Life as an author 
 (尽用而二分狂言) was published in 1791 under the pen name ", Disciple of ". This first book had a didactic tone that  would carry through most of his works going forward. This choice in tone would benefit him as literature and the laws around it had changed in 1790 with the adoption of the Kansei Reforms.  was able to avoid the punishments levied on his contemporaries like ,  and his friend and patron, .  chose to stay silent and on any controversies in his writings. 's own humiliation deeply affected him. He request  ghostwrite for him as a deadline for two works approached.

He had eleven other works published in 1797, setting a pace of about ten books per year until 1802. If he wrote a story he didn't enjoy, he would sign it ", disciple of " causing other aspiring authors to seek out this fictional disciple.

In 1800  embarked on a walking tours and his experiences would play pivotal roles in both his life and writing. The first tour lasted two months and provided him with several historical locations that would appear in his works. During this trip he also fully resolved to restore his family position using his writing.

A second walking tour in 1802 lasted three months and was a tour along the Tōkaidō Post Road. On this tour,  visited many places that would appear in his future work. He also encountered people of various social standing and professions. His travels coincided with extensive flooding across the nation.  witnessed recent destruction and displaced peoples all along the road. These encounters and experiences made their way into 's novels and lent them an honesty that would make his works popular through the entire social strata of Japan.

From 1803 to 1813,  published thirty historical novels, marking the beginning of his full career as a professional writer. Several of these works were adapted to various forms of theater across Japan. By 1810  was making a comfortable living as a writer, exceeding the stipend that had been allotted to his family while they served under  and he was considered the preeminent author of historical novels.

This success was partly due to his collaboration with famous artists. Between 1804 and 1815,  and the creative illustrator  collaborated on 13 works. In particular, published between 1807 and 1811, which borrowed the concept of The Tale of Hōgen, Taiheiki and Water Margin. There are various theories as to why  and  dissolved their cooperation, such as discordant personalities and conflicting opinions on how to draw illustrations. By 1818, with the purchase of a second household with the profits of his book sales and wife's business, the  family was officially restored. In 1820, 's son,  was appointed clan physician by Lord  making his social class officially  and  felt his family's future was secured.

The Bunka-Bunsei cultural renaissance which started in 1804 lent momentum to fiction as a whole and art flourished until the renaissance concluded around 1830. Serialized long-form works became more prevalent, not just among historical novels. It was during this time that  continued publishing profitable and popular works. These ranged among scholarly essays and journals, though his most prevalent fiction remained the historical novel. He also embarked on creating his signature piece, . This work consisted of 106 volumes, making it one of the world's longest novels, and took 28 years to complete (1814–1842). Like most of his works,  focused on  themes, including loyalty and family honor, as well as Confucianism, and Buddhist philosophy. During its production,  would recede from public life and split from his contemporaries causing rumors to circulate that he had died. Unfortunately, while working on this voluminous work,  would experience the loss of his eyesight and the death of his wife and only son.

Decline and death 
While writing,  also went about ensuring his children married well.  had married in 1815 and given birth to a son.  married  (1787-1837) in 1823 and her new husband took on the management of the family business under the name . , after a prolonged illness that kept him from his duties as a clan physician, married a young woman named  in 1827. The final parts of the work were dictated to his daughter-in-law.

's health, which had started a slow decline in 1818 worsened into the 1830s. He continued to publish but at a much slower pace than before. His wife's frequent illnesses taxed him as did his son's continued invalidity and 's rheumatism and vision loss progressed. He would feel bouts of energy between 1825 and 1835 that would allow him to continue working. In 1835,  passed and the blow was so devastating to  that he considered retiring from writing.

Fearing the collapse of his newly restored family,  decided in 1836 to hold a party to celebrate his birthday. The gala attracted leading writers and publishers, poets and entertainers, and important officials form the 's court. 's future was secured though he was too young to serve at the time. 's cousin served in his place until 1840 under the name . In order to be closer to his grandson's post,  sold the family house in the city and moved into a rural estate. He would spend the last twelve years of his life there.

 lost vision in his right eye in 1834 and was completely blind by 1840. , who could read complex literature acted as 's amanuensis from 1840 till his death in 1848. With her assistance he finished several works and answered many letters and critiques.

In the autumn of 1848,  felt chest pains and had difficulty breathing. After a short recovery he relapsed and declined the services of a physician. On November 30, he gave his final testament and passed early in the morning of December 1. He was interred in the  Temple beside his ancestors.

Influence on Japanese culture 
Nearly four decades after his death, 's works were still popular.  Many writers, such as  kept his works in the public eye.  There was, however, push back from students who had become versed in Western literature.  Foremost among them was  who heavily criticized 's didactic method of writing as pre-modern without directly attacking  in his work .  This attitude was countered by scholars like .

 made also the Japanese version of Haoqiu zhuan, titled Kyōkakuden. and authors like  used 's methodology for adapting Chinese literature to bring Western works to Japan.

The Eight Dog Chronicles has been adapted many times in, for example, the anime OVA The Hakkenden.

Kyokutei Bakin has been released as a playable 5★ Rider-class Servant in Fate/Grand Order during early summer 2022. However, this version of Bakin is actually his daughter who is using her father's True Name and powers.

Sample bibliography

Yomihon (Readers' Books) 

  1796
  (）1804
  (）1804
  1804 (Volume 1 and 2)
  1805
  1805
  1804
  1805
  1807
  1807-1811
  1808
  1808
  1808
  1808
  1808
  1808
  1809
  1810
  1814-1842
  1815 (Volume 1 Unfinished)
  (u) 1829-1830（Bunsei 12 and 13)
  1832 (Unfinished)

Gōkan 

  1812
  1825 (Unfinished)
  1839
  1831

Yellow Books 

  1791
  1797
  1800
  1801

Saijiki (Seasonal Dictionary) 

  1803 The first ""

References

External links

Takizawa Bakin in Encyclopædia Britannica

1767 births
1848 deaths
18th-century Japanese novelists
19th-century Japanese novelists
Japanese diarists
Japanese historical novelists
Japanese medical writers
Japanese serial novels
Japanese writers of the Edo period
Writers from Tokyo